Sadguru Brahmeshanand Acharya Swami is an internationally acclaimed spiritual guru.  Acharya was awarded Padma Shri in 2022 for his contribution towards spiritualism in Goa.

References

1981 births
Living people
Recipients of the Padma Shri